is a Japanese novelist.

Early life and education 
He was born in Hondo, Kumamoto Prefecture and took his doctorate degree in Japanese Language and Literature in the Graduate School of Gakushūin University in Tokyo.

Work 
His major works include the sci-fi space opera novel series entitled Ginga Eiyū Densetsu (銀河英雄伝説), also known as Legend of the Galactic Heroes , and the fantasy novel series Arslan Senki (アルスラーン戦記), also known as The Heroic Legend of Arslan, both of which were adapted as anime and manga. His fantasy works also include the novel series Sohryuden: Legend of the Dragon Kings (創竜伝) that was also adapted as anime.

Tanaka is an avid fan of Chinese history and wrote some novels set in China. He also published two arranged-translations of Chinese literature: "Sui Tang Yanyi" (隋唐演義, "Stories of Sui and Tang Dynasties") and "General Yue Fei" (說岳全傳, "Telling the Complete Biography of Yue Fei") as "Gakuhi-den" (岳飛伝, "The Story of Yue Fei"). He is also familiar with Persian history, although Arslan Senki is inspired by Persian history alongside his own thoughts and imaginations.

Major works
Legend of the Galactic Heroes (Ginga Eiyū Densetsu 銀河英雄伝説, 1981–1987) Adapted into several anime formats by Kitty Film Mitaka Studio, Magic Bus, Artland, Mushi Production, Shaft, MADHOUSE, and Production I.G.
The Heroic Legend of Arslan (Arslan Senki アルスラーン戦記, Part One 1986–1990, Part Two 1991–2017) Adapted into an OVA series by J.C.Staff and Aubec, and a TV series by Liden Films and Sanzigen.
Sohryuden: Legend of the Dragon Kings (Sōryūden 創竜伝, 1987–ongoing) Adapted into an OVA series by Kitty Film Mitaka Studio.
Tytania (Taitania タイタニア, 1988–2015) Adapted into an anime TV series by Artland.
Yakushiji Ryōko no Kaiki Jikenbo (薬師寺涼子の怪奇事件簿, 1996–2018) Adapted into an anime TV series by Doga Kobo.
Ambition Waltz (Yabou Enbukyoku 野望円舞曲, co-authored with Yuki Oginome)

Awards
 1988 Seiun Award for Legend of the Galactic Heroes

References

External links
 Wright Staff Online - official website 
 Official Blog 
 J'Lit | Authors : Yoshiki Tanaka | Books from Japan 
 Legend of the Galactic Heroes Information Center 
 Yoshishi Tanaka entry in the Encyclopedia of Science Fiction 

1952 births
Living people
20th-century Japanese novelists
21st-century Japanese novelists
People from Kumamoto Prefecture
Writers from Kumamoto Prefecture
Gakushuin University alumni